The Health and Safety Executive for Northern Ireland (HSENI) is a Northern Ireland non-departmental public body sponsored by the Department for the Economy. It is responsible for the encouragement, regulation and enforcement of occupational health and safety in Northern Ireland. Its functions are similar to those of the Health and Safety Executive in the rest of the United Kingdom. The HSENI employs approximately 105 staff.

It was founded as the Health and Safety Agency for Northern Ireland when the provisions of the Health and Safety at Work etc. Act 1974 were extended to the province in 1978. It was renamed Executive in 1998.

The Health and Safety Executive for Northern Ireland, along with the Health and Safety Executive have both been involved as partners of the Occupational Safety & Health Consultants Register (OSHCR), a consultants register set up by UK government to list registered health and safety consultants for businesses and employers.

References

External links 

Health and safety in the United Kingdom
Safety organizations
Law of Northern Ireland
Government of Northern Ireland
Organizations established in 1978
Northern Ireland Executive
Law enforcement agencies of Northern Ireland
Occupational safety and health organizations
1978 establishments in Northern Ireland